Arthur Frederick Hinz (March 28, 1886 – March 14, 1969) was a member of the Wisconsin State Assembly.

Biography
Hinz was born on March 28, 1886, in Fond du Lac County, Wisconsin. He attended Ripon High School in Ripon, Wisconsin, before graduating from the University of Wisconsin-Madison. He was a farmer. Hinz died in Ripon, Wisconsin, on March 14, 1969.

Career
Hinz was a member of the Assembly from 1937 to 1940. In addition, he was assessor and a member of the City Council of Ripon. He was a Republican.

References

People from Ripon, Wisconsin
Republican Party members of the Wisconsin State Assembly
Wisconsin city council members
University of Wisconsin–Madison alumni
Farmers from Wisconsin
1886 births
1969 deaths
20th-century American politicians